This is article about the infrastructure of Novi Sad.

Roads 
Novi Sad is connected by a motorway to Belgrade to the south-east and to Subotica to the north.  City has 369 km of roads (2004). Main thoroughfare in the city is certainly 3 km of Bulevar Oslobođenja.

Bridges 

As of 2018, there are eleven bridges in Novi Sad municipal area. Six bridges are over Danube-Tisa-Danube Canal, and five across Danube river.  Through history, many bridges are built and then destroyed during many wars in this region.

These are current bridges over river Danube (from west):
 Liberty Bridge (Most Slobode), built in 1981, destroyed in 1999 and then rebuilt in 2005. It connects Sremska Kamenica with the main Port of Novi Sad.
 Varadin Bridge (Varadinski most), built in 2000 to connect Petrovaradin with city centre.
 Road-Railway Bridge (Drumsko-železnički most), built in 2000 as a temporary solution, because rail traffic was halted during Nato bombardment in 1999. It has two line of traffic, which is also used for cars, but most important heavy trucks.
 Žeželj Bridge (Žeželjev Most), built in 1961 and destroyed in 1999. Reconstructed and reopened in 2018.
 Beška Bridge (Most kod Beške), built in 1975, situated between villages Kovilj and Beška. It was expanded in 2011. It is a part of highway E75.

Former bridges on the Danube:
 Pontoon Bridge (Pontonski most), built in 1788, existed until 1918. 
 Railway Bridge (Železnički most), built in 1883, destroyed in 1941, rebuilt in 1941, but destroyed again in 1944.
 Pontoon Bridge (Pontonski most), built in 1914, collapsed in 1924.
 Prince Tomislav Bridge (Most Kraljevića Tomislava), built in 1928, destroyed in 1941. 
 Marshal Tito Bridge (Most Maršala Tita), built in 1945, renamed to Varadin Bridge (Varadinski most) in 1991, destroyed in 1999. 
 Pontoon Bridge (Pontonski most), built in 1999, removed in 2005.

Bridges over Danube-Tisa-Danube Canal (from west):
Futog Bridge (Futoški most), small bridge which is mainly used by local farming community from surrounding settlements of Kisač, Futog and Bački Petrovac.
Rumenka Bridge (Rumenački most), situated in Rumenka.
Railway Bridge (Železnički most), which connect railway from Novi Sad to Subotica.
Klisa Bridge (Klisanski most), it is in urban part of the city, connect neighborhoods Klisa, Vidovdansko Naselje, and Slana Bara with the city centre.
Temerin Bridge (Temerinski most), it is also in urban part of the city, and it also connects neighborhoods Klisa, Vidovdansko Naselje and Slana Bara with the city centre.
Kać Bridge (Kaćki most), it connects city with highway E75 and some suburbs of Kać, Budisava and Kovilj.

The 1999 NATO bombings of the bridges of Novi Sad, and the subsequent reconstruction project, are described in detail in the film The Ister (official site here).

Railway 

The railway station is situated not far from the city centre (in Banatić neighborhood), and connects Novi Sad with major European cities, such as Vienna, Budapest, Kyiv and Moscow; but also with major towns in Vojvodina, such as Subotica, Sombor, Bačka Topola, Vrbas, Zrenjanin, Inđija and Serbian capital, Belgrade.

After the construction of the Belgrade metro, the construction of the metro in Novi Sad is also planned.

Shipping 
Novi Sad has a commercial port on the banks of Danube and Danube-Tisa-Danube Canal, named Port of Novi Sad. There is also a tourist port near Varadin Bridge in the city centre welcoming various river cruise vessels from across Europe. Novi Sad has several water-sports marinas near Ribarsko Ostrvo, Liman and Petrovaradin harbouring small sail boats and sporting/recreational vessels.

Aviation 
Novi Sad has one airport, Novi Sad-Čenej Airport, with grass surface and it is used for small aircraft, mainly for farming purposes.  It is situated next to the suburb of Čenej, about 10 km north from Novi Sad.  For international travel, there is Belgrade Nikola Tesla Airport, about 90 km south, an hour and a half drive from Novi Sad.

Public transportation 

The main public transportation system in Novi Sad consists of bus lines. In urban part of Novi Sad and Petrovaradin there are 17 bus lines, as well as 33 lines which connect villages and towns in Novi Sad and Petrovaradin municipalities, but also villages and towns in surrounding municipalities of Beočin, Temerin and Sremski Karlovci. Bus transportation is operated by JGSP Novi Sad.

In addition, there are various taxi companies serving the city.

External links
 Bridges of Novi Sad 
 Bridges of Novi Sad 
 Port of Novi Sad